Malibu Moon (February 23, 1997 – May 18, 2021) was a Thoroughbred stallion bred in Kentucky. Retired young to stud following a racing injury as a two-year-old, Malibu Moon thereafter sired multiple grade I stakes winners, two Eclipse Award winners, and was the sire of Orb, winner of the 2013 Kentucky Derby.

Background
Bred in Kentucky by B. Wayne Hughes, Malibu Moon was a bay sired by A.P. Indy out of the Mr. Prospector mare Macoumba.

Macoumba was a grade I winner in France, winning the Prix Marcel Boussac, before she was imported to the United States by B. Wayne Hughes. Macoumba's dam, Maximova, was a Gr.I winner herself, winning against males in the 1982 Prix de la Salamandre. Maximova also produced five stakes winners as a broodmare.

Malibu Moon was a half-brother to stallion Parker's Storm Cat, who is best known as the sire of the turf runner Ben's Cat. Malibu Moon's half-sister Curriculum is the dam of notable turf sire Temple City.

Race career
Malibu Moon had a short racing career, but showed initial promise. His first race was a maiden special weight as a two-year-old at Hollywood Park, and despite brushing the gate at the start he made his way through the crowd in the stretch to finish second. His second and final start was also a maiden special weight at Hollywood Park, in which he finished first. He suffered a slab fracture in his knee in May of his two-year-old season, which forced his early retirement.

Stud career
Malibu Moon first entered stud in 2000 for a low stud fee of $3,000 at Country Life Farm in Maryland. After producing Eclipse Champion two-year-old Declan's Moon and graded winner Perfect Moon in his first two crops, he was relocated in 2004 to the Castleton Lyons Farm in Kentucky to service a wider range of mares, and his fee was raised to about $10,000. He was then relocated again in 2008 to Spendthrift Farms, where he stood for a fee of $75,000 since 2017.

As of 2017, Malibu Moon sired over 100 black-type stakes winners and 40 graded stakes winners. His progeny have collectively earned over $99 million. Malibu Moon has also been recognized as a broodmare sire, particularly as the broodmare sire of Eclipse Champion Stellar Wind.

Malibu Moon died from an apparent heart attack in his paddock at Spendthrift Farm on May 18, 2021.

Malibu Moon's progeny include:
 Orb: Winner of the 2013 Kentucky Derby, Florida Derby, and Fountain of Youth Stakes
 Declan's Moon: Winner of the Hollywood Futurity, Del Mar Futurity, and Hollywood Prevue Stakes. 2003 American Champion Two-Year-Old Male.
 Life at Ten: Winner of the Ogden Phipps Handicap, Beldame Stakes, Delaware Handicap, and Sixty Sails Handicap
 Devil May Care:  Winner of the Mother Goose Stakes, Coaching Club American Oaks, Frizette Stakes, and Bonnie Miss Stakes
 Gormley: Winner of the Santa Anita Derby, FrontRunner Stakes, and Sham Stakes
 Moonshine Memories: Winner of the Del Mar Debutante Stakes and Chandelier Stakes 
 Heavenly Love: Winner of the Alcibiades Stakes 
 Carina Mia: Winner of the Acorn Stakes, Eight Belles Stakes, and Golden Rod Stakes
 Ransom the Moon: Winner of the Bing Crosby Stakes and Kona Gold Stakes 
 Obruchev: Winner of the Zen-Nippon Nisai Yushun (JPN Gr.I)
 Farrell: Winner of the Fair Grounds Oaks, Rachel Alexandra Stakes, and Golden Rod Stakes 
 Stanford: Winner of the Charles Town Classic, Harlan's Holiday Stakes, Long Branch Stakes, and Challenger Stakes 
 Ah Day: Winner of the Federico Tesio Stakes, Toboggan Handicap, Fire Plug Stakes (twice), 5 other stakes 
 Mr. Z: Winner of the Ohio Derby
 Perfect Moon: Winner of the Best Pal Stakes, Hollywood Juvenile Championship, El Cajon Stakes

Malibu Moon is the damsire of:
Stellar Wind: Winner of the Clement L. Hirsch Stakes (twice), Zenyatta Stakes, Beholder Mile Stakes, Apple Blossom Handicap, Santa Anita Oaks, Santa Ysabel Stakes, Torrey Pines Stakes, Summertime Oaks. 2015 American Champion Three-Year-Old Filly
Girvin: Winner of the Haskell Invitational Stakes, Louisiana Derby, and Risen Star Stakes 
My Conquestadory: Winner of the Alcibiades Stakes and Summer Stakes 
By the Moon: Winner of the Ballerina Stakes, Frizette Stakes, Vagrancy Handicap, Bed O' Roses Stakes (twice)

References

1997 racehorse births
2021 racehorse deaths
Racehorses bred in Kentucky
Racehorses trained in the United States
Thoroughbred family 2-s